Necessary Love is a 1991 Italian comedy-drama film written and directed by Fabio Carpi. It was screened in competition at the 48th Venice International Film Festival.

Cast 
Ben Kingsley: Ernesto 
Marie-Christine Barrault: Valentina 
Ann-Gisel Glass: Diana
Malcolm Conrath: Giacomo
Silvia Mocci: Maddalena
Geoffrey Bayldon: Bernardo

References

External links

1991 films
Italian comedy-drama films
1991 comedy-drama films
Films directed by Fabio Carpi
1990s Italian films